Maffiolus de Lampugnano, was a medieval bishop of the Roman Catholic Church.

Early in his career he was the collector of tithes. He was also a treasurer at the court of Pope Urban VI who wanted to appoint him Bishop of Krakow, but relented  due to the protest of Wladyslaw Jagiello and Krakow cathedral chapter.

In October 1385, he was appointed Archbishop of Dubrovnik (Ragusa), Croatia. Then from 10 July 1387 until 1 March 1392 he was Archbishop of Messina, Italy. 
On 1 March 1392, he was finally appointed Archbishop of Kraków, by Pope Boniface IX and a year later, on 17 April 1393, was appointed bishop of Płock, Poland.

He died on 27 July 1396 and is buried in the Vatican.

References

External links and additional sources
 (for Chronology of Bishops) 
 (for Chronology of Bishops) 

Archbishops of Kraków
Archbishops of Dubrovnik
Archbishops of Messina
Bishops of Płock
Year of birth unknown
1396 deaths
14th-century Roman Catholic archbishops in Croatia
14th-century Roman Catholic archbishops in Poland
14th-century Roman Catholic bishops in Bosnia